Thung Kula Ronghai is a natural region in northeastern Thailand. Its area is around 2.1 million rai (or 3,200 km2). It lies in the provinces of Surin, Maha Sarakham, Yasothon, Sisaket, and Roi Et.

History and legend
Its name translates to 'fields of the crying Kula'. Legend has it that the Kula, from Mottama, Myanmar, traveled through this plateau. The Kula were known for their endurance and toughness. They spent several days traveling the region without passing any villages or finding water. The surroundings had no trees to provide shade. It was only arid land. Trekking through this area was very difficult. The dry land and scarceness of water supply exhausted the Kula and made them weep.

Historically, Thung Kula Ronghai had suffered desert-like conditions during dry season and flooding during rainy season. Soils were plagued by salinity. The area has since been reclaimed and today the region has become a well-known Hom Mali rice producing area of Thailand.

References

Geography of Thailand
Agriculture in Thailand
Isan